Channelvision was an Australian subscription television channel based in Canberra that screened locally produced content. The channel launched on 1 September 2005 on TransTV, replacing the TransTV Help Channel, and mainly broadcast local content, news, interviews and local sport.

Throughout its history, Channelvision only broadcast to Canberra via TransTV. However, on 5 July 2009, Channelvision began broadcasting a half hour magazine styled program on Aurora Community Channel, available nationally via subscription services Foxtel, Austar and Optus Television.

References

External links
Official website (archived site)

Television networks in Australia
Defunct television channels in Australia
Australian community television
Television stations in Canberra
Television channels and stations established in 2005
Television channels and stations disestablished in 2014
English-language television stations in Australia